The 1993 European Super Cup was contested between AC Milan (the 1992–93 UEFA Champions League runners-up) and Parma (the 1992–93 European Cup Winners' Cup champions). It was won by Parma, 2–1 on aggregate. The final was contested over two legs with a leg at each of the sides' home grounds. The first leg took place at Ennio Tardini, Parma, on 12 January 1994 and ended 0–1. The second leg took place at San Siro, Milan, on 2 February 1994, where Parma won 2–0 after extra time.

Background
While it was Parma's first appearance in the competition, AC Milan were making their fourth appearance, having previously contested the 1973, 1989 and 1990 editions. Parma reached the Super Cup as winners of the 1992–93 European Cup Winners' Cup, having beaten Royal Antwerp 3–1 in the final at Wembley Stadium, London, while Milan lost 1–0 to Marseille in the 1993 UEFA Champions League Final at the Olympiastadion, Munich, but Marseille's subsequent ban from European football due to match-fixing meant Milan competed in the Super Cup in their place.

Milan and Parma had never played against each other in European competition, but had previously played seven leagues matches against each other, all within four years of both legs of this tie – Milan had won three matches to Parma's two, with the remaining two matches ending in draws. It was Parma's first match in Europe against a fellow Italian side, but Milan had once previously come up against opposition of the same nationality in Europe when they defeated Sampdoria over two legs (3–1) in the 1990 edition of the Super Cup.

Matches

First leg

Second leg

See also
A.C. Milan in European football
Italian football clubs in international competitions
Parma Calcio 1913 in European football

References

External links
Summary from UEFA.com
Summary from RSSSF

Super Cup 1993
Super Cup 1993
Super Cup
1993
Super Cup 1993
Sports competitions in Milan
January 1994 sports events in Europe
February 1994 sports events in Europe
1990s in Milan